Jaroslav Poupa is a Czechoslovak sprint canoer who competed in the mid-1950s. He won a bronze medal in the C-1 1000 m event at the 1954 ICF Canoe Sprint World Championships in Mâcon, France.

References

Czechoslovak male canoeists
Czech male canoeists
Possibly living people
Year of birth missing
ICF Canoe Sprint World Championships medalists in Canadian